Villa di Chiavenna is a comune (municipality) in the Province of Sondrio in the Italian region Lombardy, located about  north of Milan and about  northwest of Sondrio, on the border with Switzerland.

Villa di Chiavenna borders the following municipalities: Bondo (Switzerland), Castasegna (Switzerland), Novate Mezzola, Piuro, Soglio (Switzerland).

The actress and film director Stefania Casini was born in Villa di Chiavenna.

References

Cities and towns in Lombardy
Val Bregaglia